Infinity Rock Explosion! is the second studio album by Australian comedy band The Axis of Awesome, released on 12 February 2010.

Track listing

Personnel
Jordan Raskopoulos – vocals
Lee Naimo – guitar, vocals
Benny Davis – keyboards, vocals

References

2010 albums
The Axis of Awesome albums